KMED may refer to:

 KMED (FM), a radio station (106.3 FM) licensed to serve Eagle Point, Oregon, United States
 KYVL (AM), a radio station (1440 AM) licensed to serve Medford, Oregon, which held the call sign KMED from 1927 to 2023
 KTMT-FM, a radio station (93.7 FM) licensed to serve Medford, Oregon, which held the call sign KMED-FM from 1970 to 1972
 KTVL, a television station (channel 10) licensed to serve Medford, Oregon, which held the call sign KMED-TV from 1961 to 1977